Glass Pear is a Welsh singer and songwriter, born Yestyn Griffiths.

Early life
The Welsh singer is the younger brother of recording artist Jem.

Career
After co-writing songs for Jem's first album, Finally Woken, and the follow-up, Down To Earth, Griffiths sent a 4 track demo to the DJ Nic Harcourt of KCRW. Harcourt's early support for the tracks "Last Day Of Your Life" and "Vultures" was instrumental in getting the music heard. In late 2008, the producers of 90210 chose "Last Day Of Your Life" to end the first episode of the new series and Grey's Anatomy used the track in early 2009.

In October 2009, CW series The Vampire Diaries used Glass Pear's song "Wild Place" and "Say It Once" for season 8 of their hit series One Tree Hill. Fox's hit TV series Bones followed with a prominent placing of "My Ghost" in November towards the end of the episode. The first album, Streets of Love, was released on Griffith’s own label, WOL Records.

"Until the morning comes", a special collaboration with Jem, was released in December 2009.

An eight song EP, Sweet America, was released in August 2010.

Discography

Singles and EPs
 Glass Pear EP (2008)
 "Last Day of Your Life" – 4:16
 "Vultures" – 3:30
 "Streets of Love" – 3:47
 "Wild Place" – 3:01
 "Come Alive" – 4:56

 Last Day of Your Life (2009)
 "Last Day of Your Life" – 4:18
 "Last Day of Your Life (Acoustic)" – 4:34
 "Last Day of Your Life (Delta Heavy Remix)" – 7:41
 "Last Day of Your Life (E Disco Mega Mix)" – 5:25

 Until the Morning Comes (Feat. Jem) (2009)
 "Until the Morning Comes" – 4:19

 Sweet America EP (2010)
 "Where Is My Home?" – 4:20
 "Loveable" – 3:39
 "Say It Once" – 4:18
 "No Reason to Love" – 3:56
 "Sweet America" – 3:24
 "Eyes Wide Open" – 3:39
 "Fall to Earth" – 3:23
 "Morning Light" – 3:43

Albums
 Streets of Love (2009)
 "Last Day of Your Life" – 4:18
 "Vultures" – 3:30
 "Listen to the Music" – 4:04
 "Streets of Love" – 3:50
 "Colours" – 4:09
 "Wild Place" – 3:02
 "Come Alive" – 4:57
 "This is not a Dream" – 4:07
 "Violet Waters" – 4:26
 "My Ghost" – 2:56

 Glass Pear (2011)
 "One Day Soon" – 2:53
 "Dizzy" – 3:52
 "Planet Earth" – 3:11
 "Love is all I Need" – 4:08
 "Long Before You're Here" – 0:53
 "Oxygen" – 4:34
 "Closer" – 3:49
 "Grace" – 3:22
 "Epiphany" – 3:55
 "Summer" – 3:10
 "Eternal" – 1:49

References

External links
 Official Glass Pear website
 YouTube Official Channel
 Glass Pear at MusicBrainz

Welsh singer-songwriters
Living people
Year of birth missing (living people)
Place of birth missing (living people)
Welsh male singers
British male singer-songwriters